The DGA Lifetime Achievement Award for Distinguished Achievement in Motion Picture Direction is an American film award presented by the Directors Guild of America (DGA) honoring career achievement in feature film direction. Formerly called D.W. Griffith Award, it was first awarded at the 5th Directors Guild of America Awards in 1953. The award is considered the Directors Guild's highest honor and its recipients are selected by the present and past presidents of the DGA.

History 
Originally established in honor of D. W. Griffith, the award was called D.W. Griffith Award between 1953 and 1999. In 1999, the DGA national board voted unanimously to remove Griffith's name from the DGA's lifetime achievement award and replace the award. DGA president Jack Shea stated that, although Griffith was an influential and innovative filmmaker, he also "helped foster intolerable racial stereotypes." Particularly Griffith's film The Birth of a Nation is criticized for its heroic portrayal of the Ku Klux Klan and its negative depiction of black people. The guild's decision to change the name of its highest honor caused controversy. While NAACP president Kweisi Mfume called it "the right thing to do" and stated that the award "should have never been given under the name of D. W. Griffith," the National Society of Film Critics criticized the name change in a statement calling it "a depressing example of political correctness."

Recipients 

D.W. Griffith Award (1952–1998)

DGA Lifetime Achievement Award for Distinguished Achievement in Motion Picture Direction (1999–present)

See also 
 Directors Guild of America Lifetime Achievement Award – Television

References

External links 
 Official DGA website

Awards established in 1953
American film awards
Directors Guild of America Awards
Lifetime achievement awards